Suero de Quiñones (c. 1409 – 11 July 1456), called  ("he of the pass"), was a Leonese knight, nobleman, and author in the Kingdom of León (then part of the Crown of Castile). He gained fame for his Paso Honroso, a pas d'armes (passage of arms), at the Órbigo River in 1434.

Early life

By the 1420s, Suero and his elder brother  were active participants in Castilian political life as members of the court of Constable of Castile Álvaro de Luna.

Adulthood
In 1431, Suero participated in Battle of La Higueruela, during which the forces of John II of Castile, led by Álvaro de Luna, attempted to take Granada as part of the Spanish Reconquista.

Paso Honoroso

From July 10 to August 9, Suero and ten companions encamped in a field beside the bridge over the Órbigo River, in the northwest of Castile. They challenged each knight who wished to cross the bridge to a joust. This road was on the Camino de Santiago, a pilgrimage route leading to the shrine to Saint James the Great at Santiago de Compostela. At this point in the summer, thousands of pilgrims from across Europe would cross the bridge. Suero and his men swore to "break 300 lances" before moving from the spot. After 166 battles, Suero and his men were so injured they could not continue and declared the mission complete.

Later years
In 1449, to avoid paying off a debt to a Jewish lender, Suero reportedly rallied the Christian population of León against the city's Jews, inspired by the claim that the Jews were collectively responsible for Jesus's death. On Maundy Thursday and Good Friday, Suero and his companions attacked the Jewish quarter and killed many Jews, including the lender to whom Suero owed money. To celebrate the program, Suero and his supporters drank wine.

Legacy
Suero became legendary in Spanish history and was mentioned by protagonist Don Quixote de la Mancha in the legendary 1605 Spanish novel Don Quixote by Miguel de Cervantes.

References

Further reading

Riquer, Martín de (1967). Caballeros andantes españoles. Madrid: Editorial Espasa-Calpe.

1456 deaths
1409 births
Spanish knights
Pas d'armes
Spanish duellists
1400s births
Antisemitism in Spain